"Peace of Mind" is a song by the Bee Gees, released in Australia as their third in March 1964 and backed with "Don't Say Goodbye".

Recording and lyrics
It was later included on the group's first album The Bee Gees Sing and Play 14 Barry Gibb Songs. It was recorded in February 1964 at Festival Studio in Sydney. It was also included on the 1998 compilation Brilliant from Birth. Although no production credit is given, Robert Iredale who had produced the previous single was credited as engineer.

Barry is singing lead vocals, with Robin and Maurice Gibb singing harmony vocals. At 1:19, someone plays a lead guitar solo but the player was not credited.

Personnel
 Barry Gibb — lead vocals, rhythm guitar
 Robin Gibb — harmony and backing vocals
 Maurice Gibb — harmony and backing vocals
 Trevor Gordon — lead guitar
 Uncredited musicians — bass, drums, piano

References

1964 singles
Bee Gees songs
Songs written by Barry Gibb
1964 songs
Leedon Records singles
Rock-and-roll songs